Dermatologic Clinics is a peer-reviewed medical journal published quarterly for the Dermatologic Clinics of North America by Elsevier. It has been published since 1983.  

According to the Journal Citation Reports, the journal has a 2017 impact factor of 3.214.

References

External links

Elsevier academic journals

Dermatology journals
Publications established in 1983
Quarterly journals
English-language journals